The corpuscles of Herbst or Herbst corpuscles are  nerve-endings similar to the Pacinian corpuscle, found in the mucous membrane of the tongue, in pits on the beak and in other parts of the bodies of birds. They differ  from Pacinian corpuscles in being smaller and more elongated, in having thinner and more closely placed capsules, and in that the axis-cylinder in the central clear space is encircled by a continuous row of nuclei. They are named after the German embryologist Curt Alfred Herbst.

In many wading birds, a large number of Herbst corpuscles are found embedded in pits on the mandible that are believed to enable birds to sense prey under wet sand or soil.

References

External links
 Description at sciencedaily.com
 

Sensory receptors